Santiago Island may refer to:
Isla Santiago (Baja California Sur)
Santiago Island (Cape Verde)
Santiago Island (Galápagos)
Santiago Island (Philippines)